Employment Equality Regulations may refer to:
Employment Equality (Sexual Orientation) Regulations 2003
Employment Equality (Religion or Belief) Regulations 2003
Employment Equality (Age) Regulations 2006